Robert van Koesveld (born 24 January 1995) is a Dutch footballer who plays as a centre back for SVV Scheveningen in the Dutch Tweede Divisie.

Club career 
On 16 April 2012, Van Koesveld signed a three-year contract with Ajax, tying him down to the club until 30 June 2015. He made his professional debut for Jong Ajax in an Eerste Divisie match against FC Den Bosch on 29 August 2014. On 2 February 2015, Van Koesveld signed a contract with SC Heerenveen until the summer of 2017. He was sent on loan to Helmond Sport for the 2016-17 season.

Career statistics

References

External links
 
 

1995 births
Living people
Dutch footballers
Association football defenders
AFC Ajax players
Jong Ajax players
SC Heerenveen players
Helmond Sport players
SC Cambuur players
Eredivisie players
Eerste Divisie players
Footballers from The Hague
SVV Scheveningen players
Tweede Divisie players